The Professional Graduate Diploma in Education (PGDE) is a one-year postgraduate course for prospective teachers in Scotland. Successful completion of this course allows an individual to teach in a Scottish state school. All PGDE courses at each University are regulated by the Scottish Government and General Teaching Council for Scotland A PGDE is one of the two main routes for entering the teaching profession in Scotland, the other being a 4-year MA/BA Education course.

The course typically lasts for one full academic year, however some providers offer part-time and distance learning options which may last up to two years (for example, Dlite courses). The one-year course typically consists of 36 weeks of training, with 18 weeks spent at university learning about theory and practice and 18 weeks spent on school placements putting theory into practice.

A PGDE course can be taken in either Primary Education, which pertains to the teaching children from ages 3–12 (includes nursery provision). A PGDE in Secondary Education requires the individual to be a subject specialist and involves the teaching of children aged 11–18.

The University of Aberdeen offers the Distance Learning Initial Teacher Education (DLITE) PGDE where graduates living in or working for one of the partner local authorities can receive a teaching qualification whilst working and studying part-time over 18 months.

The DLITE PGDE is offered both as a Primary and Secondary qualification with the University of Aberdeen.

Teaching qualifications for Secondary Education in Scotland can currently be awarded in the following areas:
 Art & Design              
 Biology with Science
 Business Education
 Chemistry with Science
 Classics*
 Community Languages (Urdu)*
 Computing
 Dance*
 Drama
 Economics*
 English
 Gaelic
 Geography
 Geology
 Greek*
 History
 Home Economics
 Latin*
 Mathematics
 Media Studies*
 Modern Foreign Languages (French, Spanish, German, Italian, Mandarin and Russian)
 Modern Studies
 Music
 Philosophy*
 Physical Education
 Physics with Science
 Psychology*
 Religious Education
 Sociology*
 Technological Education
 TESOL*

The Universities which offer PGDE courses are:
 University of Aberdeen
 University of Dundee
 University of Edinburgh
 University of Glasgow
 University of the Highlands and Islands
 University of Strathclyde
 University of the West of Scotland

Courses are not always available in each of these subject specialisms. The Scottish Funding Council analyses the need for teachers in Scotland's schools and decides the number of places for each subject in order to keep up with demand. High demand subjects will have many places available every year (e.g. Primary, Physics and English), whereas low demand subjects will have relatively fewer places (e.g. Drama, Modern Studies). Some subjects will rarely run as a PGDE course as demand is so low, for example Classics and Greek.

* These subjects were not run as a PGDE course during the 2015/16 session, most likely to be run as dual qualification (e.g. History with Classics)

Entry Requirements 

In order to be accepted applicants to the PGDE (Primary) course applicants require:
 A degree validated by a higher education institution in the United Kingdom or a degree of an equivalent standard from an institution outside the United Kingdom 
 Higher English at Grade C or above (or equivalent)
 National 5 Mathematics at Grade C or above (or equivalent)

In order to be accepted applicants to the PGDE (Secondary) course applicants require:
 A degree validated by a higher education institution in the UK (or equivalent abroad) with at least 80 SCQF points coming from subjects relevant to the teaching qualification(s). Some subjects do have more specific degree requirements.
 Higher English at Grade C or above (or equivalent)
 National 5 Mathematics at Grade C or above (or equivalent)

References

Educational qualifications in Scotland
Professional titles and certifications
Vocational education in Scotland
Teacher training programs